Castallack Round or Roundago is a prehistoric site near Castallack in Cornwall, England. It is a scheduled monument.

A "round" is a small circular embanked enclosure, with one entrance; they are common in Cornwall, and they date from the late Iron Age to the early post-Roman period.

Description
The site is near the summit of a ridge overlooking the Lamorna valley. There was originally a surrounding ditch. On the tithe map of 1840, the round is depicted as having a colonnade of stones leading from the entrance in the south to an inner circular enclosure; John Thomas Blight, describing it in 1865, found that these features had mostly disappeared.

This is interpreted as a courtyard house, a type of building that developed in west Cornwall from the 2nd to 4th centuries AD.

References

Hill forts in Cornwall
Penwith
Scheduled monuments in Cornwall